Siliserh lake is situated 8 miles southwest of Alwar. It cover an area of about 7 (up to 10 square km with good monsoon) square km and are flanked by dense woodland and cenotaphs on its embankment.

History 
It was  Built in 1845 by Maharaja Vinay Singh, the then-ruler of Alwar, by constructing an embankment/bund on tributary of river Ruparel. The lake and the aqueducts that surround it were built to provide water to Alwar. The lake is flanked by its namesake palace, which was built at the king for his wife. Palace is now converted to Rtdc hotel. Boating facility also available.

See also 
List of lakes of India

References 

Lakes of India